El Diario is a newspaper of Bolivia, published in La Paz.  Founded in 1904, it is Bolivia's oldest newspaper and considered a newspaper of record for Bolivia. The newspaper traditionally followed a conservative position in line with its founders, the Carrasco family, one of La Paz's most influential families of the 20th century.

References

External links

Newspapers published in Bolivia
Publications established in 1904
Mass media in La Paz
Conservatism in Bolivia